Graffunder is a surname. Notable people with the surname include:

Carl Graffunder (1919–2013), American architect
Heinz Graffunder (1926–1994), German architect